The Kyocera K127, sometimes referred to as the Kyocera Marbl, is a clamshell-style phone from Kyocera. Features include:
LCD color display - 128 x 128 pixels
BREW downloadable games
Contact directory stores personal and business information (200 entries)
Web access: WAP 2.0 Browser 
EMS capable
GPS Locator
Voice Dialing

Other technical data:
Form Factor: Clamshell
Battery Life: Talk: 3.7 hours, Standby: 180 hours

Carriers
Virgin Mobile USA

References

External links
http://virginmobileusa.com

Kyocera mobile phones